Halfway Festival is a music festival which takes place in Northeastern Poland, in Białystok in the last week of June every year. The festival's main organizer is the Podlasie Opera and Philharmonic – European Art Centre. Its first edition happened in 2012.

Idea 
Halfway Festival is a gathering involving songwriters, folk, and alternative musicians. "It's not the biggest, or the most important, or the best festival in the world, but it provides an indescribable and unique atmosphere for its enthusiastic audience. The festival is one of a kind, as it is created by both performers and the audience – according to its motto: “Close to people, close to music”. It is a festival with no headliners – all artists, along with the audience, share the utmost importance." – say the organizers. There are no complicated, restrictive regulations. It's all based on trust and a big culture of participants. There's time to talk to artists, to see them walking around, resting or listening to other performers amongst the audience. It's the festival where nobody should hurry; the artists can play for as long as they and their fans want, as there's no time limit for the performances. It's the festival which connects the music tradition of Western and Eastern Europe, and the US in one place.

Place 
Halfway is a cameral festival which takes place in an amphitheatre with great, unique acoustics. The scenery sits really close, within the audience's reach. The amphitheatre is located at Podlasie Opera and Philharmonic – European Art Centre in Białystok – the largest institute of arts in Northeastern Poland, and the most modern cultural center in this region of Europe.
 
In between concerts it is possible to spend time in a green milieu around the amphitheatre. There is a DJ area to dance or listen to good electronic music. There are stalls with many kinds of tea, regional beer, grilled food, festival gadgets.

Artists

2019

Friday 28 June 

 Wędrowiec
 Gyða
 These New Puritans

Saturday 29 June

 Kotori
 Oxford Drama
 KÁRYYN
 My Brightest Diamond
 Julia Holter

Sunday 30 June

 Palina
 Tęskno
 Alice Phoebe Lou
 Foxing
 Strand of Oaks

2018

Friday 29 June 

 Seasonal
 amiina
 Low

Saturday 30 June 

 ugla
 Annie Hart
 Pia Fraus
 Jane Weaver
 Villagers

Sunday 01 July 

 Francis Tuan
 TonqiXod
 Anna Ternheim
 Orchestre Tout Puissant Marcel Duchamp XXL
 The Besnard Lakes

2017

Friday 23 June 
 Starsabout (Poland)
 Christine Owman (Sweden)
 Shuma (Belarus)

Saturday 24 June 
 Agata Karczewska (Poland)
 Cate Le Bon (United Kingdom)
 Juana Molina (Argentina)
 TORRES (United States)
 The Veils (United Kingdom)

Sunday 25 June 
 Coals (Poland)
 East of My Youth (Iceland)
 Nive & The Deer Children (Greenland)
 Cass McCombs Band (US)
 Angel Olsen (US)

2016

Friday 24 June
 Byen (Poland)
 Ilya (United Kingdom)
 Destroyer (Canada)

Saturday 25 June
 Coldair (Poland)
 Odd Hugo (Estonia)
 Eivør Pálsdóttir (Faroe Islands)
 Accolective (Israel)
 Ane Brun (Norway)

Sunday 26 June
 Intelligency (Belarus)
 Giant Sand (USA)
 Mammút (Iceland)
 Julia Marcell (Poland)
 Wilco (USA)

2015

Friday 26 June 
 Nathalie and The Loners (Poland)
 .K (Belarus)
 Moddi (Norway)
 Gabriel Ríos (Belgium)

Saturday 27 June 
 JÓGA (Poland)
 Garbanotas Bosistas (Lithuania)
 She Keeps Bees (USA)
 Vök (Iceland)
 William Fitzsimmons (musician) (USA)

Sunday 28 June 
 Maggie Björklund (Denmark)
 Sister Wood (Poland/England)
 Oly. (Poland)
 Sharon van Etten (USA)
 The Antlers (band) (USA)

2014

Friday 27 June 
 Overdriven Group (Poland)
 Keegan McInroe (USA)
 Phosphorescent (band) (USA)

Saturday 28 June 

 Sonia Pisze Piosenki (Poland)
 Lord & The Liar (Poland)
 Fismoll (Poland)
 Pascal Pinon (Island)
 Theodore (Greece)
 My Brightest Diamond (USA)

Sunday 29 June 
 Navi (Belarus)
 Daniel Spaleniak (Poland)
 Hymnalaya (Island)
 Lisa Hannigan (Ireland)
 Ewert and The Two Dragons (Estonia)

2013

28 June 

 Wilhelm Jerusalem (Poland)
 Anna von Hausswolff (Sweden)
 Under Byen (Denmark)

29 June 

 Bobby the Unicorn (Poland)
 HandmadE (Belarus)
 Sóley (Island)
 SoKo (France)
 Sivert Høyem (Norway)

30 June 

 Markas Palubenka (Lithuania)
 Gin Ga (Austria)
 Domowe Melodie (Poland)
 Local Natives (USA)
 Emilíana Torrini (Island)

2012 
 Lifemotiv (Poland)
 Palina Respublika (Belarus)
 Alina Orlova (Lithuania)
 Sébastien Schuller (France)
 Ludzi Na Bałocie (Belarus)
 Lech Janerka (Poland)
 Low Roar (Island)
 The Mountain Goats (USA)
 Kapela ze Wsi Warszawa (Poland)
 FolkRoll (Belarus)
 Re1ikt (Belarus)
 The Loom (USA)
 Vasya Oblomov (Russia)
 Chłopcy kontra Basia (Poland)
 Haydamaky (Ukraine)
 Sin Fang (Island)
 Great Lake Swimmers (USA)
 Woven Hand (USA)

Tickets and schedule 
There are two kinds of tickets available: three-day passes for the whole festival and one-day passes.
 
There are places in Białystok where the participants can find rooms for lower prices, as well as discounts at artistic cafés, restaurants, and pubs that cooperate with Halfway and its organizers.

All concerts start early in the evening. Prior to them, it is possible to enjoy the attractions prepared by the organizers, e.g. meet & greet with the bands, writers, yoga trainings and many others – depending on the edition of the festival.

Artists about the festival 
 Lisa Hannigan: "Lovely venue and audience! It was just really lovely... (…) I’m hoping I will be invited back."
 Shara Worden (My Brightest Diamond) – asked why she came to Europe without a European tour, only for the festival – answered: "I was invited. (laugh) I’s that simple. I heard how lovely this festival was so I thought it was a great opportunity to finally come to Poland. So I did."
 Matthew Houck (Phosphorescent (band)): "It's gorgeus here! It's way more gorgeous than I thought it could be!"
 Theodore: „One of the best gigs in my life!"

References

External links 
 The Official Website
 Press conference 2014
 HFB 2014 Review

Music festivals in Poland
Rock festivals in Poland
Summer events in Poland